The 2015 Syracuse Orange football team represented Syracuse University in the 2015 NCAA Division I FBS football season. The Orange were led by third year head coach Scott Shafer and played their home games at the Carrier Dome. They were members of the Atlantic Division of the Atlantic Coast Conference. They finished the season 4–8, 2–6 in ACC play to finish in fifth place in the Atlantic Division.

On November 23, head coach Scott Shafer was fired. He stayed on to coach their final game on November 28. He finished at Syracuse with a three-year record of 14–23.

Schedule

Schedule Source:

Game summaries

Rhode Island

Wake Forest

Central Michigan

LSU

at South Florida

at Virginia

Pittsburgh

at Florida State

at Louisville

Clemson

at NC State

Boston College

References

Syracuse
Syracuse Orange football seasons
Syracuse Orange football